The Rural Municipality of Wood Creek No. 281 is a rural municipality (RM) in the Canadian province of Saskatchewan within Census Division No. 11 and  Division No. 5. It is located in the south-central portion of the province.

History 
The RM of Wood Creek No. 281 incorporated as a rural municipality on December 13, 1909.

Geography 
The RM is adjacent to Last Mountain Lake.

Communities and localities 
The following urban municipalities are surrounded by the RM.

Villages
 Simpson

The following unincorporated communities are within the RM.

Localities
 Amazon

Demographics 

Government 
The RM of Wood Creek No. 281 is governed by an elected municipal council and an appointed administrator that meets on the second Thursday of every month. The reeve of the RM is Glen Busse while its administrator is Darlene Mann. The RM's office is located in Simpson.

References 

Wood Creek
Division No. 11, Saskatchewan